The Intel 8089 input/output coprocessor was available for use with the 8086/8088 central processor. It was announced in May 1979, but the price was not available at that time.  It used the same programming technique as 8087 for input/output operations, such as transfer of data from memory to a peripheral device, and so reducing the load on the CPU.  This I/O processor was available in July 1979 for US$194.20 in quantities of 100 or more.  Intel second sourced this coprocessor to Fujitsu Limited.

Because IBM didn't use it in IBM PC design, it did not become well known; later I/O-coprocessors did not keep the x89 designation the way math coprocessors kept the x87 designation.  It was used in the Apricot PC and the Intel Multibus iSBC-215 Hard disk drive controller. It was also used in the Altos 586 multi-user computer. Intel themselves used the 8089 in their reference designs (which they also commercialized) as System 86.

Peripherals 
 Intel 8282/8283: 8-bit latch
 Intel 8284: clock generator
 Intel 8286/8287: bidirectional 8-bit driver.  Both Intel I8286/I8287 (industrial grade) version were available for US$16.25 in quantities of 100.
 Intel 8288: bus controller
 Intel 8289: bus arbiter

Literature and datasheets 
 8089 Assembler Users Guide; Intel 1979
 8089 8 & 16-Bit HMOS I/O Processor; Intel 1980
 John Atwood, Dave Ferguson: Debugging Strategies And Considerations For 8089 Systems, Application Note (AP-50), September 1979, Intel Corporation.
 Jim Nadir: Designing 8086, 8088, 8089 Multiprocessing System With The 8289 Bus Arbiter, Application Note (AP-51), März 1979, Intel Corporation.
 Robin Jigour: Prototyping with the 8089 I/O Processor, Application Note (AP-89), Mai 1980, Order number AFN 01153A, Intel Corporation.
 Hard Disk Controller Design Using the 8089, Application Note (AP-122), Order number 210202-001, Intel Corporation.
 Graphic CRT Design Using the Intel 8089, Application Note (AP-123), Intel Corporation.

References 

80089
Input/output integrated circuits